Hero Wanted is a 2008 American thriller film directed by Brian Smrz in his directorial debut. The film stars Cuba Gooding Jr., with a supporting cast of Ray Liotta, Kim Coates, and Norman Reedus. The film was released on direct-to-DVD in the United States on April 29, 2008.

Plot
Liam Case (Cuba Gooding Jr.) is a garbage man whose life hasn't quite turned out the way he expected it would. In order to impress the girl of his dreams, Liam plans an elaborate bank heist that will culminate with him jumping in to save the day at the last minute. When the day of the heist arrives, however, the plan takes an unexpected turn and both the girl and Liam end up being shot by one of the robbers. After recovering from his injury, Liam kills the robber who shot him and the girl.  He then realizes that the associates of the dead robber will not stop until they have avenged that death.

Cast
 Cuba Gooding Jr. as Liam Case
 Ray Liotta as Detective Terry Subcott
 Kim Coates as Skinner McGraw
 Norman Reedus as Swain
 Jean Smart as Melanie McQueen
 Christa Campbell as Kayla McQueen
 Ben Cross as Cosmo Jackson
 Tommy Flanagan as Derek
 Gary Cairns II as Gill
 Steven Kozlowski as Lynch McGraw
 Sammi Hanratty as Marley Singer
 Paul Sampson as Gordy McGraw
 Todd Jensen as Detective Wallace MacTee

Production
Shooting took place in Sofia, Bulgaria in 32 days on April 3 and May 5, 2007.

Home media
DVD was released in Region 1 in the United States on April 29, 2008, and also Region 2 in the United Kingdom on 16 June 2008, it was distributed by Sony Pictures Home Entertainment. It is included a downloadable Digital Copy (PC and PSP) version of the disc with studio-imposed restrictions (and was one of the first DVDs to offer this now commonplace feature).

Reception
David Johnson of DVD Verdict wrote, "It's violent and over-the-top, but Hero Wanted is ultimately a slick, hollow affair."

References

External links
 
 
 

2008 films
2008 crime thriller films
2008 directorial debut films
2000s police procedural films
2000s vigilante films
American films about revenge
American crime thriller films
American gangster films
American police detective films
American vigilante films
Direct-to-video thriller films
Films about domestic violence
Films about murderers
Films shot in Bulgaria
Nu Image films
Sony Pictures direct-to-video films
2000s English-language films
2000s American films